Neil is a masculine given name of Gaelic origin.

Neil may also refer to:

 Neil Road, Singapore
 Neil Island, now Shaheed Island, Andaman Islands
 Nuclear Electric Insurance Limited, a mutual insurance company

See also
 
 
 MacNeil
 McNeil
 MacNeill
 McNeill (disambiguation)
 Neal
 Neale (disambiguation)
 Neill 
 O'Neill (disambiguation)
 Nail (disambiguation)
 Nell (disambiguation)
 Niel, Belgium
 Njáls saga, is a thirteenth-century Icelandic saga
 Justice Neil (disambiguation)